Robert Hay may refer to:

 Robert Hay (mayor), mayor of Reading 1399 and 1400
 Robert Hay (architect) (1799–1867) architect of several free churches including Dunfermline and Dollar, Clackmannanshire and also notable works to Fordell Castle
 Robert Hay (Egyptologist) (1799–1863), Scottish Egyptologist
 Robert Hay (bishop of Buckingham) (1884–1973), Bishop of Buckingham in the Church of England
 Robert Hay (bishop of Tasmania) (1867–1943), Bishop of Tasmania in Anglican Church of Australia
 Robert Hay (furniture manufacturer) (1808–1890), Canadian furniture manufacturer and politician 
 Robert Hay (rower) (1897-1968), Canadian Olympic rower
 Robert William Hay (1786–1861), Permanent Under-Secretary of State for the Colonies, 1825–1836
 Robert Hay-Drummond, 10th Earl of Kinnoull (1751–1804), peer of Scotland and Lord Lyon King of Arms
 Robert Hay (footballer) (born 1954), Australian footballer for South Melbourne
 Robert Walker Hay (1934–1991), British chemist
 R. Couri Hay (born 1949), American publicist, blogger and gossip columnist

See also
Bob Hay (disambiguation) 
Robert Hayes (disambiguation)
Robert Hays (born 1947), American actor